Butrus al-Bustani (1819–1883) was a writer and scholar from present day Lebanon. He was a major figure in the Nahda, which began in Egypt in the late 19th century and spread to the Middle East.

He is considered to be the first Syrian nationalist, due to his publication of Nafir Suria which began following the 1860 Mount Lebanon civil war. In 1870, he founded Al-Jinan, the first important example of the kind of literary and scientific periodicals which began to appear in the 1870s in Arabic alongside the independent political newspapers.

Life
Al-Bustani was born to a Lebanese Maronite Christian family in the village of Dibbiye in the Chouf region, in January 1819. He received primary education in the village school, where he attracted the attention of his teacher, Father Mikhail al-Bustani, because of his keen intelligence that he showed brilliantly.

The latter recommended him to the Bishop of Sidon and Beiteddine, Abdullah al-Bustani, who sent him at the age of 11 to the school at ‘Ayn Warqa in Ghosta, the most famous school of that period, to continue his studies there. At ‘Ayn Waraqa where he learned Syriac and Latin. He spent ten years there and learned several foreign languages including French, Italian and English.

In 1840, after completing his studies at ‘Ayn Warqa’, Al-Bustani moved to Beirut and obtained his first employment outside of academia as a dragoman for the British Armed Forces assisting them in their efforts in evicting Ibrahim Pasha from Syria in the interest of preserving the Ottoman Empire. Later that year al-Bustani was hired by American Protestant Missionaries as a teacher and from that point on he worked closely with the Protestant mission in Beirut.

In Beirut, he came into contact with the American Protestant missionaries with whom he worked closely until his death on May 1, 1883. Following his initial employment with the American Protestant Mission in Beirut al-Bustani spent most of his years working for the American Protestant Mission. It was during these years that al-Bustani converted to their Protestant faith and completed many of his early works. Arabic grammar and arithmetic books were among these early works along with the Van Dyck's version of the Bible, the most popular Arabic translation of the Bible used today. Both al-Bustani and Nasif Al-Yaziji worked on Van Dyck's version under the supervision of Eli Smith who was an American Protestant  Missionary, scholar and Yale graduate. The translation project was continued unto fruition after al-Bustani under Cornelius Van Allen Van Dyck. While working to translate the Bible, Al-Bustani learned Hebrew, Aramaic and Greek, and perfected Syriac and Latin thus bringing the number of languages he mastered to nine.

Role in al-Nahda

In the late 1840s al-Bustani obtained the position of the official dragoman for the American Consulate in Beirut which he held until he passed it on to his son Salim in 1862. Through the 1850s Bustani continued to work closely with the Protestant Missionaries in their attempt of proselytizing and educating Arab Christians in the Levant. However, at this time al-Bustani began to diverge from the Missionaries method of education and began to express publicly the need for an Arabic identity that would be reflected in all spheres of society. In a lecture, “on the literature of the Arabs”, given in February 1859 al-Bustani publicly called for a revival of literature and scholarly works in the Arabic language. It was also in 1859 that al-Bustani disengaged from his work with the mission and devoted his time to this cause. Shortly after his lecture in Beirut in 1859, al-Bustani became the secretary of a cultural association for the publication of Arabic books, al-Umda’ al-Arabiyya l-Ishar al-Kutub al-Arabiyya. It was al-Bustani's exodus from religious education and move towards secular, national education at this time that revolutionized Arab culture and set the stage for the Nahda.

Following the Maronite/Druze civil war of Mount Lebanon in 1860, al-Bustani, having witnessed these political/religious tensions, published an irregular newspaper which he called Nafir al-Surriya (a Clarion of Syria), wherein he voiced his ideal of a Syrian fatherland. Along with instilling Syrian Patriotism and “proto-nationalism”, Al-Bustani sought to reform education and so founded the madrasah al-Wataniyya in Beirut in 1863, his own National School in Lebanon where he applied his theories on education, namely his educational agenda. The National School educated its students in Arabic, French, English, Turkish, Latin and Greek and modern sciences without the pretense of religion but with an obvious nationalistic aim. Al-Bustani welcomed students from all religions and races and qualified staff not based on their religious standing but their competence and professional qualities. The school was successful because it was unique in Syria at the time as being an educational institution based on secular ideals of equality and non-discrimination and thus stood against the religious schools that were closed off to the modern world. However, the rising religious solidarity in Syria eventually led to it being closed in 1878.

It was during the proceeding years throughout the 1860s that his major contributions to the Nahda emerged. These included a daily newspaper and the first Arabic encyclopedia Al-Muhit al Muhit (The ocean of oceans) and an Arabic dictionary dairat al-ma’arif (dictionary of knowledge). Al-Bustani's intention in these works was to form a common body of knowledge which, though was very French, was considered universal. It was at this time that he came to be known famously as the Master and Father of the Arabic Renaissance. The greater part of his life's work was reviving and creating a love for the Arabic language, bringing Arabic into a place of affluence and utility as a tool for Arabs to express their thoughts and ideas in the modernising world of the 19th century. In 1868, al-Bustani helped found the Syrian Scientific Society al-Ja’miyya al-Ilmiyya al-Suriyya, a group of intellectuals who would be a part of promoting the study of science in educational institutions in Syria.

Al-Bustani made large strides in forging a nationalism for Arabs by adopting and contextualizing European political and social values and education while maintaining a distinct nationalism, patriotism and Arab identity. All of this was to the advancement and continuation of the Arab cultural and literary renaissance at large that moved from Egypt to Syria/Lebanon. The reforms in the Ottoman Empire (see Tanzimat) from 1839–1876 and the work of the Young Ottomans strongly influenced al-Bustani to see that “Ottomanism”  was the best means of achieving nationalism politically being that it was the closest model available for him in Syria and in particular it was a Romantic nationalism, whereby one must recreate or recover a culture by looking into the past. In Bustani's case he looked to the scientific revolution in the Golden Age of Islam under the Abbasid Caliphate in Baghdad (8th to 13th century A.D.) He argued that at that time, Europe was in the decline of the Dark Ages and that Arabs must once again reclaim that heritage. However, it wasn't an Islamic heritage Bustani was after for he was a secularist. Though a Protestant Christian, he did not seek religious reform but rather a reform similar to what the French had with the separation of the Church institutions from the State institutions. It was this very separation that was key for the European Renaissance and al-Bustani saw the same need for the Nahda. Al-Bustani viewed the edicts of the Young Ottomans as freedom for non-Muslims and an opportunity for Arabs in Syria to gain sovereignty. Thus politically, he helped Syria towards Ottomanism in the sense that the edicts allowed participation of citizens of the state regardless of religious affiliation.

Education, for Bustani, was the main vehicle to achieve an Arab identity and nationalism and it was only by the mass production of literature and its speedy circuit throughout the Middle East, afforded by the Nahda, that such an identity could be formed. Al-Bustani's years in the Protestant Mission led him to be at odds with educating a people about remote places and histories clearly seen in a quote from a lecture of his on education, "there should be one educational system for (all) the children of the nation (‘Umma), to safeguard its (cultural) identity. Thus in the realm of education, Bustani helped pave the way for a distinctly Arab education. His national/secular educational agenda in the midst of religious education was paramount to Syria's development. Al-Bustani's contributions to Arab language and literature and his creating a medium and structure to spread his ideas and the ideas of other intellectuals in Syria led to great reforms of literature and moreover created a common body of  knowledge for the Arab, a body that was a pre-requisite to modernity and Arab and also, some state, Syrian nationalism. Butrus al-Bustani stands among the reformers that helped push the Middle East into modernity without seeing the reform as primarily Islamic. For he took a non-sectarian approach and worked to bring together both Christians and Muslims into the greater agenda of the revolution of Arab identity and culture.

Achievements
In the social, national and political spheres, he founded associations with a view to forming a national élite and launched a series of appeals for unity in his magazine Nafir Suriya.

In the educational field, he taught in the schools of the Protestant missionaries at ‘Abey before founding his own National School in 1863 on secular principles. At the same time, he compiled and published several school textbooks and dictionaries to become known famously as the Master and Father of the Arabic Renaissance.

Al-Bustani compiled an Arabic dictionary and published eleven volumes of an Arabic encyclopedia with the help of his sons. He wished to spread awareness and appreciation for the Arabic language, hoping to promote the cultural significance of the Middle East in the modern world.

In the cultural/scientific fields, he published a fortnightly review and two daily newspapers. In addition, he began work, together with Drs Eli Smith and Cornelius Van Dyck of the American Mission, on a translation of the Bible into Arabic known as the Smith-Van Dyke translation. He founded the National School in Beirut.

His prolific output and groundbreaking work led the creation of modern Arabic expository prose. While educated by westerners and a strong advocate of western technology, he was a fierce secularist, playing a decisive role in formulating the principles of Syrian nationalism (not to be confused with Arab nationalism).

Stephen Sheehi states that al-Bustani's "importance does not lay in his prognosis of Arab culture or his national pride. Nor is his advocacy of discriminately adopting Western knowledge and technology to 'awaken' the Arabs’ inherent ability for cultural success (najah) unique among his generation. Rather, his contribution lays in the act of elocution. That is, his writing articulates a specific formula for native progress that expresses a synthetic vision of the matrix of modernity within Ottoman Syria."

Works on Education
'Discourse on Education Given at the National School.' In: Al-Jinan (Beirut), no. 3, 1870.
'The National School.' In: Al-Jinan (Beirut), no. 18, 1873.
'Discourse on Science among the Arabs', Beirut, 15 February 1859.
'Discourse on the Education of Women', given in 1849 at the meeting of members of the Syrian Association and published in the Actes de l'Association syrienne, Beirut, 1852.
'Discourse on Social Life', Beirut, 1869.
Boutros al-Boustani. Textes choises. With a commentary by Fouad Ephrem al-Boustani. Beirut, Publications de l'Institut des Lettres Orientales, 1950. (Collection Al Rawai')
The writings and speeches of Butrus al-Bustani, either in published or manuscript form, are preserved in the 'Yafeth' Library at the American University of Beirut and available to readers and researchers.

Early Educational Works
The Van Dyck Version of the Bible –the Arabic translation of the Bible

Muhit al-muhit –the Arabic Dictionary

 – an Arabic Encyclopedia, 1876

Nafir Suriya – a magazine

Associations
Al-Bustani along with Nasif –al-Yajizi and Mikhail Mishaqa played a crucial role in the founding of three associations:
 the Syrian Association (1847–52)
 the Syrian Scientific Association (1868)
 the Secret Association (1875)

Masonic activities 
He belonged around 1865 to the first lodge of Lebanese Freemasonry, the lodge "Palestine N ° 415" in the East of Beirut, lodge founded in Beirut on May 1861 by the Grand Lodge of Scotland.

References

Rana Issa, "The Arabic Language and Syro-Lebanese National Identity Searching in Buṭrus Al-Bustānī's Muḥīṭ Al-Muḥīṭ," in "Journal of Semitic Studies", October 2017, pp. 465–484.
Britannica article
William L. Cleveland, A History of the Modern Middle East. Westview Press, 2013, pp. 119.
Stephen Sheehi, "Butrus al-Bustani: Syria's Ideologue of the Age," in "The Origins of Syrian Nationhood: Histories, Pioneers, and Identity", edited by Adel Bishara. London: Routledge, 2011, pp. 57–78.
Stephen Sheehi, Foundations of Modern Arab Identity, Gainesville: University Press of Florida, 2006.

1819 births
1883 deaths
19th-century writers from the Ottoman Empire
19th-century translators
Nahda
Converts to Protestantism
Lebanese Protestants
Former Maronite Christians
Academics from the Ottoman Empire
Maronites from the Ottoman Empire
Translators of the Bible into Arabic
Syrian nationalists
Ottoman Arab nationalists
Lebanese magazine founders